3210 or variant, may refer to:

In general
 A.D. 3210, a year in the 4th millennium CE
 3210 BC, a year in the 4th millennium BCE
 3210, a number in the 3000 (number) range

Roads numbered 3210
 Hawaii Route 3210, a state highway
 Louisiana Highway 3210, a state highway
 Texas Farm to Market Road 3210, a state highway
 Malaysia Federal Route 3210, a highway in Selangor
 A3210 road, in the UK

Other uses
 3210 Lupishko, an asteroid in the Asteroid Belt, the 3210th asteroid registered
 Nokia 3210, a cellphone

See also